Besar Island,  is an island in Mersing District, Johor, Malaysia. The island was previously known as Pulau Babi Besar ('big boar island').

Name

Geology
The island, which is surrounded by Rawa, Sibu and Tinggi Island, is characterised by quiet, clean beaches of powdery white sand and crystal-clear azure waters. To preserve the unspoiled marine life, the Government has gazetted it as a marine park to protect around 60 species of marine life from any activities that can harm their natural habitats within  around the island.

Rich hues of wild vegetation are dappled throughout with the lush greens of the coconut palms and tropical jungles.

Administrative divisions
The island is divided into 6 villages, which are:
 Atap Zing Village
 Batu Hitam Village
 Busong Village
 Teluk Bakau Village
 Teluk Kampa Village
 Teluk Penagat Village

Transportation

The island is accessible by boat from Mersing Town in Johor mainland.

See also
 List of islands of Malaysia

References

External links

 Malaysia Travel Guide: Locally known as Pulau Besar or Big Island

Islands of Johor
Mersing District